Reinaudi may refer to:

 Silvina Reinaudi, Argentine children's literature writer
 Anticlimax reinaudi, a marine gastropod mollusc

See also
 Reinaud (disambiguation)
 Reynaudia, a genus of plants in the grass family